John I. Harris was an American Negro league pitcher in the 1920s.

Harris played for the Brooklyn Royal Giants in 1921 and 1922. In five recorded appearances on the mound, he posted a 4.50 ERA over 36 innings.

References

External links
Baseball statistics and player information from Baseball-Reference Black Baseball Stats and Seamheads

Year of birth missing
Year of death missing
Place of birth missing
Place of death missing
Brooklyn Royal Giants players